J. Stuart Adams (born 1954 or 1955) is the Senator for the Utah State Senate's 7th District. Prior to redistricting he represented the 22nd District.  Adams was appointed to the Utah House of Representatives in 2002, and then to the Senate in 2009.  In 2012, he was chosen to be Senate Majority Whip. In 2018, he was chosen as the Senate President.

Personal life, education, and career
Adams graduated from Layton High in 1972, and earned his Bachelor of Arts at the University of Utah in business finance. He is a business man by profession. Adams is married to his wife, Susan and they have four children together. In 2002, he was awarded the Business Person of the Year by the Utah State Chamber of Commerce, and as the Builder of the Year by the Northern Wasatch Home Builders Association.  Adams previously served as the President of the Northern Wasatch Home Builders Association.

Political career
Adams is a former chairman of the Utah State Transportation Commission.  He served as chairman of the Military Installation Development Authority (MIDA). Prior to his legislative service, Adams served 9 years on the Layton City Council.

Adams served 4½ years in the Utah State House of Representatives (June 19, 2002 – December 31, 2006).  He commenced his service in the Senate on September 16, 2009. He was appointed to both of these positions. In 2004, [then Representative] Adams was named the 2004 Legislator of the Year by the Salt Lake Chamber of Commerce, the 2004 Legislator of the Year by the International Code Council, and 2004 Representative of the Year by the Davis County Republican Women.

In 2016, Adams served as the Majority Whip. He also served on the following committees: 
Executive Appropriations Committee
Infrastructure and General Government Appropriations Subcommittee
Public Education Appropriations Subcommittee
Senate Business and Labor Committee
Senate Transportation and Public Utilities and Technology Committee
During the 2016 legislative session, Adams sponsored high-profile legislation that deals with energy and the environment. His bill SB 246 will take public money from certain counties within the state and put it towards building a port in Oakland. The port will be used to ship coal and other products, which the state of Utah currently exports. The bill has drawn criticism from lawmakers in Oakland and environmentalists.

In September 2018 Adams was instrumental in obtaining a $1.4 million appropriation to overpay for software from the Utah company Qualtrics. No wrongdoing is alleged, but the appropriation was costly to the state's taxpayers.

COVID Response 
During the 2020 COVID-19 pandemic in Utah, Adams supported legislation to stockpile the experimental medication hydroxychloroquine. Soon it emerged that Utah had purchased $800,000 worth of the drug, at vastly inflated prices, from a local pharmacy with personal connections to Adams.

In 2022, Adams, serving as the Utah Senate president, opened the 2022 general session of the 64th legislature in person, without a mask. Having recently contracted COVID-19 the week before, Adams proclaimed recovery while speaking to the Senate at the start of the session. It was later revealed that he had tested positive for COVID-19 twice that very morning. In violation of CDC recommendations, Adams continued his legislative duties unmasked, conversing in close contact with fellow senators, staff and dignitaries, only wearing the required protection when meeting with members of the media.

CDC guidelines at the time stated that someone with COVID-19 should isolate for five days and then wear a mask for an additional five days to prevent the spread of the virus. His disregard for health and safety practices quickly became the subject of social media discussions, national news commentary and political cartoons.

2021 Congressional Redistricting 
In 2018 and independent redistricting commission was formed to better represent the public's voice when it came to redrawing Utah's congressional maps. A bipartisan group was formed to recommend congressional, state senate, state house, and state school board district boundaries based on public feedback and a strong focus on representation of "communities of interest." November 1, 2021, the commission delivered their 12 recommendations that were vetted through 16 public hearings across the state to the legislature. The Princeton Gerrymandering Project gave favorable reviews to the maps the council drew. The state legislature, under the leadership of Senate President Stuart, ignored the commission's recommendations and drew and approved their own maps. They divided Salt Lake County, the largest and most diverse county in the state, into the four congressional districts.

Election

2014

Legislation

2016 sponsored bills

2017 sponsored bills

References

External links
Utah State Legislature – Senator Stuart Adams Official website
Campaign Website – Senator Stuart Adams (UT) Personal website

1950s births
21st-century American politicians
Latter Day Saints from Utah
Living people
University of Utah alumni
Republican Party Utah state senators